Marshall Houts (1919–1993) was an American academic, attorney, and author. Educated at Brevard College and the University of Minnesota Law School, Houts authored 44 books and helped create the television series Quincy, M.E. He authored a book on the death of Sir Harry Oakes and a book (co-authored with Harold Stassen) on Dwight Eisenhower. He was in the FBI, Office of Strategic Services, and CIA. He served as a municipal-court judge, married, and had seven children.

Earl Stanley Gardner dedicated his 63rd  Perry Mason book, The Case of the Shapely Shadow, to Houts for the "outstanding work he is doing in the field of legal medicine."

References

California lawyers
Minnesota lawyers
University of Minnesota Law School alumni
Brevard College alumni
1919 births
1993 deaths
People from Chattanooga, Tennessee
20th-century American lawyers